Jan Wagner (born 18 October 1971), is a German poet, essayist and translator, recipient of the Georg Büchner Prize and Leipzig Book Fair Prize.

Life 
Wagner was born in Hamburg, and grew up north of it, in the small town of Ahrensburg in Schleswig-Holstein. He studied English (Anglistics) in Hamburg, Dublin and Berlin, and graduated from Hamburg University, and at Trinity College, Dublin.
In 2008, he was Max Kade German Writer in Residence at Oberlin College. In 2001 his first volume of poetry "Probebohrung im Himmel" was published. Wagner's poems have been translated into thirty languages. Wagner has been translator of English-language poetry (Charles Simic, James Tate, Simon Armitage, Matthew Sweeney and others), freelance reviewer (Frankfurter Rundschau and others) and until 2003 co-editor of the international literature box "The Outside of the Element". 

Since 1995, he lives in Berlin.

Awards
 2001: Förderpreis Hermann-Hesse-Preis
 2004: Anna Seghers Prize
 2010: Villa Massimo Scholarship, Rome
 2011: Friedrich Hölderlin Prize of the City of Tübingen
 2011: Kranichsteiner Literaturpreis
 2015: Mörike-Preis der Stadt Fellbach
 2015: Leipzig Book Fair Prize
 2017: Georg Büchner Prize
 2017: Zhongkun International Poetry Prize of the University of Peking
 2020/2021: Poetik-Professur an der Universität Bamberg (33rd poetics professor at the University of Bamberg).
 2021: PONT Euro-Mediterranean literary prize, Koper/Capodistria, Slovenia

Memberships
 PEN Centre Germany
 Deutsche Akademie für Sprache und Dichtung
 Bayerische Akademie der Schönen Künste
 Akademie der Wissenschaften und der Literatur Mainz

Works 
 Probebohrung im Himmel. Gedichte. Berlin Verlag, Berlin 2001, .
 Guerickes Sperling. Gedichte. Berlin Verlag, Berlin 2004, .
 Achtzehn Pasteten. Gedichte. Berlin Verlag, Berlin 2007, .
 Australien. Gedichte. Berlin Verlag, Berlin 2010, .
 Die Sandale des Propheten. Essays. Berlin Verlag. Berlin 2011, .
 Die Eulenhasser in den Hallenhäusern. Drei Verborgene. Gedichte. Hanser Berlin, Berlin 2012, .
 Poesiealbum 295. Märkischer Verlag Wilhelmshorst 2011, .
 Der verschlossene Raum. Münchner Reden zur Poesie. Herausgegeben von Maria Gazzetti und Frieder von Ammon, Lyrik Kabinett München, 2012. .
 Regentonnenvariationen. Gedichte. Hanser Berlin, Berlin 2014, .
 Selbstporträt mit Bienenschwarm. Ausgewählte Gedichte 2001–2015. Hanser Berlin, Berlin 2016, .
 Der verschlossene Raum. Beiläufige Prosa. Hanser Berlin, Berlin 2017, .
 Contributor to A New Divan: A Lyrical Dialogue Between East and West (Gingko Library, 2019), .
 Der glückliche Augenblick. Beiläufige Prosa. Essays. Hanser Berlin, Berlin 2021, .

References

Further reading

External links 

1971 births
Living people
Writers from Hamburg
German poets
German essayists
German translators
Georg Büchner Prize winners